The Cup of Zimbabwe (most recently known as the CBZ FA Cup due to sponsorship) is the top knockout tournament of the Zimbabwean football. It was created in 1962 as the Cup of Southern Rhodesia and was known between 1965 and 1980 as the Cup of Rhodesia. Due to sponsorship, the competition has undergone a number of name changes: from its creation in 1962 until 1998, the cup was known as the Castle Cup, after its sponsor, the Johannesburg-based Castle Lager. Castle also sponsored the Northern Rhodesian (Zambian from 1964) equivalent of the competition, which led to the creation of the "Super Castle Cup", played between 1962 and 1965 between the winners of the Southern Rhodesia Castle Cup and its Northern Rhodesian (from 1962 to 1964) or Zambian (in 1965) equivalent. After the cessation of Castle sponsorship, the competition was abandoned for two seasons before being brought back in 2001 as the ZIFA Unity Cup. It retained this name until 2006, when it was known as the CBZ Cup. This name was extended to CBZ FA Cup in 2007. The cup was not played in 2009 or 2010.

A new competition, the Mbada Diamonds Cup, was launched in 2011, with the 16 teams from the Zimbabwe Premier Soccer League participating. The winner will qualify for the CAF Confederation Cup.

Winners

Mbada Diamonds Cup
2011: Dynamos 1–0 Motor Action
2012: Dynamos 2–0 Monomotapa United
2013: Highlanders 3–0 How Mine

Chibuku Cup
2014: FC Platinum 1–1 (3–1 pen.) Harare City
2015: Harare City 2–1 Dynamos
2016: Ngezi Platinum 3–1 FC Platinum
2017: Harare City 3–1 How Mine
2018: Triangle United 2–0 Harare City
2019: Highlanders 1–0 Ngezi Platinum
2020:   Not played
2021: FC Platinum''' 0–0 (5–3 pen.) Ngezi Platinum

References
 

Football competitions in Zimbabwe
National association football cups
Recurring sporting events established in 1962
1962 establishments in Southern Rhodesia